KZLC-LP (95.5 FM) is a radio station broadcasting a Christian-based variety format. Licensed to Pineville, Louisiana, United States, the station is currently owned by Louisiana College.

References

External links
 Official Website
 

Christian radio stations in Louisiana
College radio stations in Louisiana
Low-power FM radio stations in Louisiana
Mass media in Alexandria, Louisiana